William de St Liz (fl. 1312) was an English politician.

He was a Member (MP) of the Parliament of England for Rutland in 1312. He may have been related to another Rutland MP, Richard de St Liz, who represented the constituency in 1328, 1330, 1335 and 1336.

References

Year of birth unknown
14th-century deaths
English MPs 1312